Around the Bay in a Day is a non-competitive fully supported recreational cycling fundraising event organised by Bicycle Network in Victoria, Australia. Cyclists register to ride a course which is  either clockwise or anti-clockwise around Port Phillip Bay, starting and ending in Melbourne, though other distances, both shorter and longer, are available.

Routes

Cyclists register to ride a course which was originally  (but later augmented with a  option) either clockwise or anti-clockwise around Port Phillip Bay, starting and ending in Melbourne, and catching the Searoad Ferry between Queenscliff and Sorrento. Half of the riders head towards the east-side of the bay, riding to Sorrento, and the other half head west towards Queenscliff. Riders cross the bay near the Port Phillip heads on ferries to complete the ride.

In 2005 entrants were offered shorter alternative rides, a  ride from Sorrento to Docklands, or a  ride to the western suburbs and return from the Alexandra Gardens using the West Gate Bridge in both directions.

With the popularity of these alternative shorter routes, and responding to the growing number of cyclists wanting to take part in Australia's biggest one-day challenge ride, the then Bicycle Victoria devised four options for the ride scheduled for 15 October 2006. The organisers expected 9000 participants to choose from the Legend  or the Challenge  ride. Less experienced riders could pick the Classic, which included the West Gate Bridge, or the Bay Ride. A post ride count put the number of total entrants to more than 14,000, raising $440,000.

 The Legend starts at Docklands, heads down to Queenscliff via Geelong and the Bellarine Peninsula, crosses on the ferry to Sorrento, then back to Melbourne.
 The Challenge takes the opposite tack down to Sorrento, cross to Queenscliff on the ferry, then back to Melbourne, without the Bellarine Peninsula section.
 The Classic starts in Sorrento, heads back to Melbourne via the Mornington Peninsula.
 The  Bay Ride starts at Docklands, pedals to Williamstown, over the West Gate Bridge and back to the cycling festival.

History
The event was first run in 1993, following on from the success the then Bicycle Victoria had experienced with its Great Victorian Bike Ride. Approximately 500 cyclists took part in the inaugural event.

In October 2004, over 8,600 riders took part. In 2005 almost 11,000 people registered for the ride and raised about $300,000 for The Smith Family charity for disadvantaged children.

In 2008 more than 16,000 riders participated in Around the Bay in a Day. Several riders were injured before the start of the ride when a car hit a leading rider in a group on the Nepean Highway at around 4am just south of Mt Eliza. Later on the same day, a male rider collided with a fellow rider and fell head first on to the road at Olivers Hill near Frankston. He was taken to the Alfred Hospital but later died from his injuries.

In 2012, over 17,000 riders took part across the various distances.

On 9 October 2016, the strongest winds hit riders of the event when a cold front brought in wind gusts of up to 100 km/h.

See also 

Cycling in Melbourne

References

External links

Recurring sporting events established in 1993
Cycling in Melbourne
Port Phillip
1993 establishments in Australia
Cycling events in Victoria